Killora is a rural locality on Bruny Island in the local government area of Kingborough in the Hobart region of Tasmania. The 2016 census has no population information for the state suburb of Killora.

History
Killora was gazetted as a locality in 1971.

Geography
The D'Entrecasteaux Channel forms the western boundary.

Road infrastructure
The C625 route (Killora Road) enters from the north and runs through to the south.

References

Localities of Kingborough Council
Towns in Tasmania
Bruny Island